This is a list of notable authors of fiction and/or non-fiction works about BDSM. For other notable people associated with BDSM, see List of people associated with BDSM.

 Solace Ames, American author of erotic fiction
 Laura Antoniou, writing as Sara Adamson,  author of The Marketplace series of novels
 Pablo Neruda
 Go Arisue, Japanese bondage artist and author
 Guy Baldwin, psychotherapist and author known for his work on BDSM and sexual related issues
 Violet Blue, American journalist, author, editor, advisor, and educator
 Gloria Brame, American sexologist, writer and sex therapist
 Rachel Kramer Bussel, American author, columnist, and editor, specializing in erotica
 Patrick Califia, American writer of non-fiction essays about sexuality and of erotic fiction and poetry
 Casey Calvert, American pornographic actress and film director
 Greta Christina,  American atheist, blogger, speaker, and author
 David Aaron Clark, American  author, musician, pornographic actor, and pornographic video director
 John Cleland, English novelist best known for his fictional Fanny Hill: or, the Memoirs of a Woman of Pleasure Oniroku Dan, Japanese author of popular SM novels
 Tess Danesi, American sex educator, blogger, and writer of BDSM erotica
 Tony DeBlase, American leatherman and zoologist, sometimes writing as Fledermaus
 Samuel R. Delany, American author and literary critic
 Anne Desclos, Franch writer also writing as Dominique Aury and Pauline Réage, author of Story of O Vanessa Duriès, French novelist, author of The Ties That Bind Dossie Easton, American author and family therapist, author of The Ethical Slut Stephen Elliott, author of My Girlfriend Comes to the City and Beats Me Up Melissa Febos, American writer, professor and former dominatrix, author of the memoir Whip Smart Bob Flanagan, American performance artist and writer known for his work on sadomasochism
 Maîtresse Françoise, also writing as Annick Foucault, French dominatrix and author
 Mary Gaitskill
 Jeff Gord, real name Jeffrey E. Owen, British bondage photographer and writer of erotic fiction
 Tilly Greene
 Matthias T. J. Grimme, German author and publisher of sadomasochistic literature. author of Das SM-Handbuch Andrei Gusev, Russian writer and journalist
 Hardy Haberman, American author, filmmaker, educator, and activist
 Laurell K. Hamilton
 Janet Hardy, American writer and sex educator, and founder of Greenery Press
 Lee Harrington, American sexuality and spirituality educator, author, and artist
 Emma Holly, American author who specializes in writing erotic romance novels
 Trevor Jacques,  Canadian author, activist, sex researcher, and IT consultant, author of On The Safe Edge: A Manual for SM Play Maxim Jakubowski
 Elfriede Jelinek
 V. M. Johnson, American leatherwoman, leather activist and author
 E.L. James, real name Erika Leonard, British author writing as E.L. James, author of Fifty Shades of Grey novels
 Alan Mac Clyde (1930s novelist), pseudonym of unknown author 
 Alan Mac Clyde (1950s novelist), pseudonym of unknown author 
 Mistress Matisse, American dominatrix
 Malcolm McKesson, American author and outsider artist
 Midori, American bondage artist
 Lord Morpheous, Canadian sex educator, author and photographer
 Charles Allen Moser, American physician, clinical sexologist, sex therapist, and sex educator
 John Norman, real name |John Frederick Lange, Jr., American academic and novelist writing as John Norman, author of the Gor series of novels
 John Preston, American author and editor of gay erotica
 Carol Queen, American author, editor, sociologist and sexologist
 Anne Rice, writing as A. N. Roquelaure, author of The Sleeping Beauty Quartet Catherine Robbe-Grillet, writing as Jean de Berg and Jeanne de Berg, author of The Image Pam Rosenthal, writing as Molly Weatherfield, American author of erotic historical romance novels
 Robert J. Rubel, American author and educational speaker in the field of alternative sexuality
 Gayle Rubin, American cultural anthropologist
 Leopold von Sacher-Masoch, Austrian nobleman, writer and journalist, author of Venus in Furs Donatien Alphonse François, Marquis de Sade, French nobleman, author of Justine, or the Misfortunes of Virtue; Juliette, The 120 Days of Sodom and Philosophy in the Bedroom Ariel Sands, pseudonymous author of the sadomasochistic novel Never the Face Terence Sellers, American dominatrix and writer, author of The Correct Sadist: The Memoirs of Angel Stern''
 Elf Sternberg, author of online erotic fiction
 Gengoroh Tagame, pseudonymous Japanese manga artist
 Cecilia Tan, writer, editor, sexuality activist, and founder of Circlet Press
 Bernard J. Taylor
 Claire Thompson
 Larry Townsend, American author and activist
 Kitty Tsui, American author, poet, actor, and bodybuilder
 Alison Tyler, pseudonymous American author, editor and publisher of erotica
 Mollena Williams-Haas, American writer, BDSM educator, actress, and former International Ms. Leather
 Jay Wiseman, American BDSM author, educator, and expert witness

BDSM